Desert were an electronic and house music duo from Liverpool, England.  Members of the outfit are the producers Paul Kane and Paul Pringle.  In 2001 they hit #1 on the U.S. Billboard Hot Dance Club Play chart with "Lettin' Ya Mind Go". They also reached number 74 in the UK Singles Chart. In 2002 their follow-up, "I See the Light," peaked at #34 in the Hot Dance Club Play listings.

Discography
 "Hourglass" (1994)
 "Moods" (1995) #124
 "Feelings Run So Deep" (1996) #129
 "Seasons" (1997)
 "Loose It (To the Sound)" (1998)
 "Voices" (1998)
 "Kollage" (1999)
 "Bitcrusher" (2000)
 "Lettin' Ya Mind Go" (2001) #74
 "I See the Light" (2002) #99
 "Beyond the Sun" (feat. John Power) (2003) #137

See also
List of number-one dance hits (United States)
List of artists who reached number one on the US Dance chart

References

British dance music groups
British electronic music groups
English house music groups